Ergin is a Turkish name, and can be used as both a given name and surname. Notable people with the name include:

Given name
 Ergin Ataman (born 1966), Turkish basketball coach
 Ergin Keleş (born 1987), Turkish footballer

Surname
 Ayşegül Ergin, Turkish female Taekwondo practitioner
 Ertuğ Ergin, Turkish alternative pop-rock singer-songwriter
 Kazım Ergin (1915–2002), Turkish geophysicist
 Sadullah Ergin (born 1964), Turkish politician
 Tarik Ergin (born 1961), Turkish-American actor
 Yusuf Ergin (born 1984), Turkish athlete

Turkish-language surnames
Turkish masculine given names